Grimethorpe Miners Welfare F.C. was an English association football club based in Grimethorpe, South Yorkshire.

History
The club was formed as Grimethorpe Rovers prior to the outbreak of the Second World War, and after the end of hostilities changed name to Grimethorpe Athletic. In 1959 (a year after changing name again - to Grimethorpe Miners Welfare), the club joined the Yorkshire League, winning the Division Two title (and with it promotion) at the first attempt, and also the prestigious Sheffield & Hallamshire Senior Cup by beating Denaby United in the final. They spent three years in the top flight before being relegated back to Division Two in 1963. Two years later the club resigned from the league and returned to local football.

By the mid-1970s Grimethorpe were playing in the Doncaster & District Senior League, winning the Division One title in 1977 before winning back-to-back Premier Division titles in 1978 and 1979. In 1980 they rejoined the Yorkshire League, entering Division 3 and winning promotion at the first attempt. In 1982 the Yorkshire League merged with the Midland League to form the Northern Counties East League (NCEL), and Grimethorpe were among the founder members of the new competition.

They entered the FA Vase for the first time in 1982, and won back-to-back promotions in the mid-1980s (despite finishing 7th and 12th) to reach the NCEL's Premier Division. They were relegated back to Division One after three years, but resigned from the league part way through the 1990–91 season. In 1993 they joined the Sheffield & Hallamshire County Senior League (S&HCSL), winning two successive promotions to reach the Premier Division by 1995. After finishing 3rd in the S&HCSL's top flight, they joined the Central Midlands League (CMFL), winning promotion in their debut season to reach the CMFL Supreme Division.

After four years in the CMFL, they resigned and seemingly disbanded again. In 2002 the club was reformed in the S&HCSL, but would only last a further year before dissolving for good.

League and cup history

Honours

League
Yorkshire League Division Two
Promoted: 1959–60 (champions)Yorkshire League Division Three
Promoted: 1980–81
Northern Counties East League Division One
Promoted: 1986–87
Northern Counties East League Division Two
Promoted: 1985–86
Central Midlands League Premier Division
Promoted: 1996–97
Sheffield & Hallamshire County Senior League Division Two
Promoted: 1993–94 (champions)
Sheffield & Hallamshire County Senior League Division One
Promoted: 1994–95 (champions)
Doncaster & District Senior League Premier Division
Champions: 1977–78, 1978–79
Doncaster & District Senior League Division One
Promoted: 1976–77 (champions)

Cup
Sheffield & Hallamshire Senior Cup
Winners: 1959–60
Runners-up: 1995–96

Records
Best FA Vase performance: 3rd Round, 1982–83

References

Defunct football clubs in England
Defunct football clubs in South Yorkshire
Yorkshire Football League
Doncaster & District Senior League
Northern Counties East Football League
Sheffield & Hallamshire County Senior Football League
Central Midlands Football League
Sheffield Association League
Barnsley Association League
Mining association football teams in England